Zohreh (Persian: زهره, Arabic:الزهرة) is a Persian female given name which means "Venus".

People
 Zohreh Akhyani
 Zohreh Jooya
 Zohreh Lajevardi
 Zohreh Mojabi
 Zohreh Sefati
 Zohreh Tabibzadeh-Nouri

See also
 Zohreh, a proposed state-owned communications satellite that was not built.
 Zahreh, a city in and the capital of Cham Khalaf-e Isa District, in Hendijan County, Khuzestan Province, Iran, also sometimes romanized Zohreh

References

Persian feminine given names